The Prague Slavic Congress of 1848 took place in Prague between 2 June and 12 June 1848.  It was the first occasion on which voices from nearly all Slav populations of Europe were heard in one place.

Several other  were held in different central and eastern European cities over the next century.

Background

The initiative came from Pavel Jozef Šafárik and Josip Jelačić, but was organized by Czech activists František Palacký, Karl Zapp, Karel Havlíček Borovský, and František Ladislav Rieger.

The exact goal of the Congress was unclear even as it was beginning.  In addition to lacking a goal, the conference planners also quarreled over the format and the agenda of the gathering. Perhaps this was an indication of how difficult the conference would be for the factions to come together.

Once underway, the conference met in three sections: Poles and Ukrainians (at that time Ruthenians); South Slavs; and Czecho-Slovaks. The Pole-Ukrainian section contained a combination of Ruthenes, Mazurians, Greater Poles, and Lithuanians. Of the total 340 delegates at the Congress, the greatest number came from the Czecho-Slovak section. 237 Czecho-Slovaks participated along with 42 South Slavs and 61 Pole-Ukrainian. German was the primary language used during discussions.

During the Congress, there was debate about the role of Austria in the lives of the Slavs. Dr. Josef Frič argued that the “primary goal is the preservation of Austria”, adding that the Congress “only differs on the means.” This point was disputed by Ľudovít Štúr who told the Congress, “our goal is self-preservation”.  Such a disconnect was typical of the environment of this conference.

One important statement did come out of the conference around 10 June, when the Manifesto to the Nations of Europe was pronounced. The statement was a strongly worded proclamation that demanded an end to the oppression of the Slav people. The Slavs did not look for any type of revenge, but they wanted to “extend a brotherly hand to all neighbouring nations who are prepared to recognize and effectively champion with us the full equality of all nations, irrespective of their political power or size”. This was an important development because it indicated some sort of unity among all of the Slav people of Europe.

The Congress was cut short on 12 June because of the Prague Uprising of 1848 that erupted due to Austrian garrison in Prague opened fire on a peaceful demonstration. This later became known as the Whitsuntide events because of the timing during the Christian holiday of Pentecost. The delegates left in disgust and some were even arrested because of the revolutionary nature of the Congress which marked a period in the history of Austria as the Bach's absolutism (after the Interior Minister Baron Alexander von Bach). Among arrested was Mikhail Bakunin who became apprehended in Dresden in 1849 for his involvement in 1848 Prague events and deported to the Russian Empire.

Congress Commissions

Czech-Slovak Commission
 František Palacký, Czech historian, oversaw the entire conference as president.
 Pavel Jozef Šafárik, Slovak philologist, poet, literary historian and ethnographer, chairman of the Czecho-Slovaks.
 Ľudovít Štúr, Slovak poet, journalist, publisher, teacher, philosopher, linguist and member of the Hungarian Parliament.
 František Zach, Czech-born soldier and military theorist.

Polish-Ruthenian Commission

The commission was created on the initiative of František Palacký and Mikhail Bakunin. It was headed by Leon Sapieha and discussed issues of the Polish-Ruthenian relations. Galician Ruthenians (native pronunciation Rusyns, modern Ukrainians) were represented by the political organizations Supreme Ruthenian Council and Ruthenian sobor.
 Karol Libelt, Polish philosopher, writer, political and social activist, social worker, chairman of the Poles and Ukrainians.
 Supreme Ruthenian Council (Iwan Borysykewycz, Hryhorij Hynyłewycz, Ołeksa Zakłynśkyj)
 Ruthenian sobor (Leon Sapieha, Jan Tadeusz Lubomirski, Kasper Cięglewicz, Ludwik Stecki)

South Slavic Commission
 Stanko Vraz, Slovene-Croatian poet, vice-president of congress.
 Pavo Stamatović, Serbian writer, historian, and archpriest, chairman of the South Slavs.
 Jovan Subotić, Serbian lawyer, writer, politician and academic.

Notes

Further reading

Polišenský, Josef: Aristocrats and the Crowd in the Revolutionary Year 1848.  Albany: State University of New York Press, 1980.

External links
 Slavic Congress in Prague at the Encyclopedia of Ukraine
 Dr. T. Mackiw. 150 YEARS AGO: The Ukrainian National Awakening in Halychyna. The Ukrainian Weekly. November 8, 1998.
 Stebliy, F.I. 1848 Slavic Congress in Prague. Encyclopedia of History of Ukraine.

Pan-Slavism
1848 in the Austrian Empire
1848 conferences
Revolutions of 1848 in the Austrian Empire
19th century in Prague
Political movements in the Austrian Empire
Poland–Ukraine relations
Participants of the Slavic Congress in Prague 1848